North Manly is a suburb of northern Sydney, in the state of New South Wales, Australia 17 kilometres north-east of the Sydney central business district in the local government area of Northern Beaches Council. It is part of the Northern Beaches region.

History
Corrie Road Post Office opened on 1 August 1916, was renamed North Manly in 1926 and closed in 1978.

Parks
Manly District Park, Nolan Reserve, Warringah Golf Course.

References

Suburbs of Sydney
Northern Beaches Council